Center Point is an unincorporated community and census-designated place (CDP) in Howard County, Arkansas, United States. It was first listed as a CDP in the 2020 census with a population of 179.

History
When Howard County formed in 1873, Center Point was its first county seat. After the first railroad in the county was built through Nashville—bypassing Center Point—the county seat was moved there in 1884.

Demographics

2020 census

Notable people
 Carl Boles, outfielder for the San Francisco Giants, was born in Center Point.
 Eurith D. Rivers, the 68th Governor of Georgia, was born in Center Point.
 Dorothy Shaver, born in Center Point in 1893, was the first woman in the United States to head a multimillion-dollar company, Lord & Taylor.
 Robert G. Shaver, lawyer, colonel in Confederate States Army, and Ku Klux Klan leader.

Notes

References

Unincorporated communities in Howard County, Arkansas
Unincorporated communities in Arkansas
Census-designated places in Howard County, Arkansas
Census-designated places in Arkansas